The Exotic Birds was an American Synthpop music group formed in Cleveland, Ohio, United States, in 1982 by three Cleveland Institute of Music percussion students (Andy Kubiszewski, Tom Freer and Timothy Adams Jr.) They wrote their own music, and were described as synthpop and dance. They achieved mainly local success, but appeared as an opening band for Culture Club, Eurythmics, and Information Society.

History

The band's first single, "Dance the Night Away," was backed with an earlier recording, "Who Knows Why,"  by Kubiszewski and Nick Capetanakis (who performed with Kubiszewski in a prior group.) The order of the songs was accidentally flipped on the record, so the older song appeared as the A side.  "Who Knows Why" received moderate local radio play and became a surprise hit in Japan. The band eventually grew to five members. Adams left to do orchestral work, but Mark Best and Frank Vale signed on. Then by 1985, Trent Reznor joined the band on keyboards, programming and backing vocals. Shortly after that, Freer departed the band for the Norrköping Symphony Orchestra and was replaced by Reznor's roommate, Chris Vrenna who would also later join Reznor's touring band for Nine Inch Nails. Exotic Birds remained Kubiszewski's project as neither Reznor nor Vrenna wrote any of the songs. By 1988, the band had broken up.

Reformation
Kubiszewski reformed with a new line-up including Doug Beck and Richard Carpenter, and released the group's first CD Equilibrium. In 1990, Doug Beck left, and Nick Rushe joined on keyboards.  The band signed to Alpha International Records out of Philadelphia, PA for what was to be their next album.  Instead, Alpha repackaged Equilibrium, cutting several tracks, and adding the new song "Imagination" to lead off the disc.  Alpha was bought out just days after "Imagination" was released as a single.  After Rushe departed, Rodney Shields (keyboards) and Marty Step (guitar) joined, rounding out would be the final Exotic Birds' line-up.

In 1993, Kubiszewski left to play drums with The The and later for Crowded House, Prick and Stabbing Westward, but returned for one final gig on Saturday, January 22, 1994.

Reznor, Vale and non-Exotic Birds member Mark Addison were the fictional band "The Problems" in Paul Schrader's 1987 Cleveland set movie Light of Day featuring Michael J. Fox and Joan Jett.

One-time Exotic Birds manager John Malm was Reznor's long-time manager and co-founder of Nothing Records.

To this day, Freer, now with the Cleveland Orchestra, and Adams, formerly with the Pittsburgh Symphony Orchestra, remain close friends and often teach together.

Discography

"Who Knows Why" / "Dance the Night Away" 7" (1983)
 "Who Knows Why" (A. Kubiszewski/N. Capetanakis) [3:27]
 "Dance the Night Away" [3:59]

Exotic Birds (1984)
 "I'll Never Say Goodbye" (A. Kubiszewski) [3:52]
 "Waiting For You (Na Na)" (A. Kubiszewski) [5:40]
 "No Communication" (A. Kubiszewski) [3:38]
 "Fade Away" (A. Kubiszewski) [5:40]
 "Take Your Chances" (A. Kubiszewski) [5:03]
 "Demon Dance" (T. Adams) [5:30]
 "No Communication (TV Version)" (A. Kubiszewski) [3:53]

L'oiseau (1986)
 "Dancing on the Airwaves" (A. Kubiszewski) [3:40]
 "Have You Heard the News" (A. Kubiszewski) [3:42]
 "The Meaning of Love" (T. Freer/A. Kubiszewski) [2:37]
 "This Must Be Heaven" (A. Kubiszewski) [4:53]
 "Nothing Lasts Forever" (T. Freer) [3:54]
 "Fighting Fire With Fire" (A. Kubiszewski) [4:58]
Backing Vocals by Rebecca Harper.

War Crimes (1987)
1. "Rise Up" [3:22]

2. "Kneel To Pray" (Cassette only)

2. "My Savior" [3:21] (Vinyl only)

3. "Radiation / Contamination" [4:16]

Equilibrium (Pleasureland) (1989)
 "Everything Is Different Now" [4:16]
 "Day After Day" [3:12]++
 "The Rhythm of Machinery" [3:42]
 "Fashion and Luxury" [4:11]
 "Heartbeat Like A Drum" [4:31]
 "This Feeling" [3:35]
 "The Touch" [3:33]
 "Dance With Me" [4:33]
 "Pleasure" [3:39]+
 "Every Star Was You" [4:40]
 "Day After Day" (Remix) [4:47]
 "Heartbeat Like A Drum" (The E-Z Listening Mix) [7:04]
 "Dance With Me" (Disco Invader Mix) [6:34]
 "Pleasure" (Dreamworld Mix) [5:35]
 "Every Star Was You" (Celestial Mix) [6:03]
All songs written by A. Kubiszewski except +by Doug Beck, and ++by Pete Ham.

Equilibrium (Alpha International) (1990)
 "Imagination" [4:20] (Andy Kubiszewski/Richard Carpenter)
 "Day After Day" [3:12] (Pete Ham)
 "Everything Is Different Now" [4:10]
 "Heartbeat Like A Drum" [4:16]
 "Every Star Was You" [4:35]
 "Fashion and Luxury" [4:11]
 "The Touch" [3:33]
 "This Feeling" [3:34]
 "Rhythm of Machinery" [3:44]
 "Dance With Me" [4:36]
All songs written by Andy Kubiszewski except as indicated.

Unreleased songs
 Cruel Heart
 Devices and Desires
 Don't Breathe a Word
 God
 Haunting Me
 I Will Die For You
 Join Hands
 Never Enough
 Never For You
 Set Me Free
 Sometimes It Hurts
 Temptation's Deep Blue Eyes
 What Do I Have to Do?
 Who Knows What Love Is

References

External links
 Article on Adams and Freer
 
 
 Exotic Birds Fan created YouTube Channel

Musical groups from Cleveland
Musical groups established in 1983
Musical groups disestablished in 1991
Trent Reznor
American synth-pop groups